Alfred Lloyd (born 1837) was a public official and state legislator in North Carolina. He represented New Hanover County in the North Carolina House of Representatives in 1872 and 1874. He represented Pender County in the North Carolina House in 1876.

He was born in Onslow County. He lived in Wilmington. He also served as justice of the peace. In 1874, he was one of the incorporators of the Farmers, Mechanica and Laborers' Union Aid Association.

He served with fellow New Hanover Representatives Henry Brewington and William H. Moore in 1874. All three were African American.

Pender County was established from New Hanover County in 1875. Lloyd, an African American, was Pender County's first representative in the state house. He was a Republican.

He built the Union Chapel Methodist Church at Harrison Creek.

References

1837 births
Year of death missing